The Impact World Championship is a professional wrestling world heavyweight championship owned by the promotion Impact Wrestling, formerly Total Nonstop Action Wrestling (TNA). From June 2002 to May 2007, TNA used the NWA World Heavyweight Championship as their primary championship as part of an agreement with the National Wrestling Alliance (NWA). On May 13, 2007, the NWA abruptly ended the arrangement and retrieved control of the NWA World Heavyweight Championship. On the same night, TNA were set to host their annual Sacrifice pay-per-view event, in which the NWA World Heavyweight Championship was to be defended by then-champion Christian Cage against Kurt Angle and Sting in a three-way match. Angle won the match and on the following episode of TNA's television program Impact! on May 17, was declared the new TNA World Heavyweight Champion. He was stripped of the championship later in the program, with Management Director Jim Cornette citing a problematic finish to the title match. The ownership of the championship was decided on June 17, 2007, at TNA's Slammiversary event in a King of the Mountain match involving Angle and Cage along with A.J. Styles, Chris Harris and Samoa Joe, which Angle won.

Being a professional wrestling championship, the title is won via a scripted ending to a match or awarded to a wrestler because of a storyline. All title changes have occurred at Impact Wrestling-promoted events; reigns that occurred on Impact Wrestling usually air on tape delay and as such are listed with the day the tapings occurred, rather than the air date. Angle holds the record for most reigns, with six. At + days, Josh Alexander's second and current reign is the longest in the title's history. Josh Alexander's first reign holds the record for shortest reign in the title's history at only a few minutes. Josh Alexander is the current champion in his second reign, having won it on April 23, 2022, at Rebellion against Moose. Overall, there have been 56 reigns shared among 32 wrestlers, with six vacancies.

Title history

Names

Reigns 
For a list of world champions in TNA between 2002 and 2007, see the list of NWA World Heavyweight Champions.

Combined reigns 

See also 
 List of current champions in Impact Wrestling
 Championships in Impact Wrestling

References

External links 
 Impact World Championship

Impact Wrestling champions lists